This article lists international philatelic exhibitions (unless otherwise stated).
(FIP) = Fédération Internationale de Philatélie patronage or recognition

Africa

Algeria
 Exposition Philatelique Internationale de L'Afrique du Nord, Alger, 3–11 May 1930

Egypt
 CAIRO'91, Cairo, 7–12 October 1991

South Africa
 South African International Stamp Exhibition, 1928
 JIPEX '36 International Philatelic Exhibition, Johannesburg, 2–4 November 1936
 South African Tercentenary International Stamp Exhibition
 UNIPEX 1960 International Philatelic Exhibition, Johannesburg, 30 May-4 June 1960
 INTERSTEX '71 International Stamp Exhibition, Cape Town, 22–31 May 1971
 SAPHIL '74 Stamp Exhibition, Pretoria, 7–12 October 1974
 Johannesburg 100 International Philatelic Exhibition, Johannesburg, 6–11 October 1986
 ILSAPEX '98 International Stamp Exhibition, Johannesburg 20–25 October 1998
 JOBURG 2010 (26th Asian International Stamp Exhibition), Johannesburg, 27–31 October 2010 (FIP)
 SOUTH AFRICA 2022, Cape Town, 8–12 November 2022 (FIP)

Asia

West

Armenia
 Armenia '90 International Philatelic Exhibition, Yerevan, 27 November – 10 December 1990

Cyprus
 Cyprus - Europhilex '95, Nicosia, 20–28 October 1995
 Cyprus - Europhilex '02, Nicosia, 22–29 October 2002

Israel
 Tabil '57 International Stamp Exhibition, Tel Aviv, 17–23 September 1957
 Jerusalem '73 International Stamp Exhibition, Jerusalem, 25 March-2 April 1974 (postponed from 19 to 30 December 1973) (FIP)
 Israphil '85 World Stamp Exhibition, Tel Aviv, 14–22 May 1985 (FIP)
 Israel '98 World Stamp Exhibition, Tel Aviv, 13–21 May 1998 (FIP)
 Israel World Stamp Championship 2008, Tel Aviv, 14–21 May 2008 (FIP)
 World Stamp Championship Israel 2018, Jerusalem, 27–31 May 2018 (FIP)

Turkey
 İstanbul 63 International stamp exhibition, İstanbul, 7–15 September 1963 (FIP)
 Istanbul '96 World Philatelic Exhibition, Istanbul, 27 September-6 October 1996 (FIP)

UAE
 DUBAI 2006 (19th Asian International Stamp Exhibition), Dubai, 13–16 November 2006.
 Dubai 2009 International Stamp Exhibition, Dubai, December 2009
 Sharjah 2012 (28th Asian International Stamp Exhibition), Sharjah, 20–25 November 2012.

East

People's Republic of China
China '96 - 9th Asian International Stamp Exhibition, Beijing, 18–24 May 1996
Shanghai '97 - International Stamp & Coin Exhibition, Shanghai, 1997
 CHINA '99 World Philatelic Exhibition, Beijing, 21–30 August 1999 (FIP)
China '03 - (16th Asian International Stamp Exhibition), Mianyang city, Szechuan, 20–24 September 2003
China 2009 International Stamp Exhibition, Luoyang City, Henan, 10–16 April 2009 (FIP)
 Beijing 2009 AEROPEX International Stamp Exhibition, Beijing, 12–16 November 2009
 27th Asian International Stamp Exhibition, Wuxi, 11–15 November 2011
 China 2016 (33rd Asian International Stamp Exhibition), Guangxi, 2–6 December 2016 (FIP)
 China 2019 International Stamp Exhibition, Wuhan, 11–17 June 2019 (FIP)

Hong Kong
 HONG KONG 1997 (11th Asian International Stamp Exhibition), Hong Kong, 12–16 February 1997
 HONG KONG 2001 (15th Asian International Stamp Exhibition), Hong Kong, 1–5 February 2001
 Hong Kong 2004 Stamp Expo (17th Asian International Philatelic Exhibition), Hong Kong, 30 January-3 February 2004
 HONG KONG 2009 (23rd Asian International Stamp Exhibition), Hong Kong, 14–17 May 2009
 Hong Kong 2015 (31st Asian International Stamp Exhibition), Hong Kong, 20–23 November 2015

Macao
 MACAO 2018 (35th Asian International Stamp Exhibition), Macao, 21–24 September 2018

Japan
 Philatokyo '71 International Philatelic Exhibition, Tokyo, 20–30 April 1971
 JAPEX 79 International Stamp Exhibition, Tokyo, 2–4 November 1979
 Philatokyo '81 International Stamp Exhibition, Tokyo, 9–18 October 1981 (FIP)
 PHILANIPPON '91 World Stamp Exhibition, Tokyo, 16–24 November 1991 (FIP)
 Philanippon '01 International Stamp Exhibition, Tokyo, 1–7 August 2001 (FIP)
 Japan World Stamp Exhibition 2011, Yokohama, 28 July-2 August 2011 (FIP)
 PHILANIPPON 2021 (37th Asian International Stamp Exhibition), Yokohama, 25–30 August 2021 (FIP)

Republic of Korea
 Phila Korea 1984 World Philatelic Exhibition, Seoul, 22–31 October 1984 (FIP)
 Philkorea 1994 World Stamp Exhibition, Seoul, 16–25 August 1994
 PHILAKOREA 2002, Seoul, 2–11 August 2002 (FIP)
 PHILAKOREA 2009(24th Asian International Stamp Exhibition), Seoul, 30 July-4 August 2009
 PHILAKOREA 2014, Seoul, 7–12 August 2014 (FIP)

Taiwan
 ROCPEX '78 International Philatelic Exhibition, Taipei, 20–29 March 1978
 ROCPEX '81 International Philatelic Exhibition, Taipei, 25 October-2 November 1981
 Taipei '93: Asian International Invitation Stamp Exhibition, Taipei, 14–19 August 1993
 TAIPEI 1996 (10th Asian International Stamp Exhibition), Taipei, 21–27 October 1996
 TAIPEI 2005 (18th Asian International Stamp Exhibition), Taipei, 19–24 August 2005
 Taipei 2008 (21st Asian International Stamp Exhibition), Taipei, 7–11 March 2008
 Taipei 2015 (30th Asian International Stamp Exhibition), Taipei, 24–28 April 2015
 Philataipei 2016 World Stamp Championship Exhibition, Taipei 21–26 October 2016 (FIP)
 Taipei 2023 (40th Asian International Stamp Exhibition), Taipei, 11–15 August 2023

South

India
 International philatelic & postal exhibition 1954, New Delhi, 1–15 October 1954
 INDIPEX '73 international philatelic exhibition, New Delhi, 14–23 November 1973
 ASIANA 1977 (1st Asian International Stamp Exhibition), Bangalore, 19–23 October 1977.
 India '80, Indian International Stamp Exhibition, New Delhi, 25 January- 3 February 1980 (FIP)
 India '89 World Philatelic Exhibition, New Delhi, 20–29 January 1989 (FIP)
 Indepex '97 world philatelic exhibition, New Delhi, 15–22 December 1997 (FIP)
 INDEPEX ASIANA 2000 (14th Asian International Stamp Exhibition), Calcutta (now Kolkata, 7–12 December 2000.
 Indipex 2011, New Delhi, 12–18 February 2011 (FIP)

Pakistan
 ECOPHILEX '86 International Stamp Exhibition, Islamabad, 21–24 December 1986

local, Peshawar organize by. Peshawar Stamp Society
1. Peshphx 87
2. Peshphx 90
3. Peshphx 92
4. Peshphx 93
5. Peshphx 94
6, Peshphx 95

Southeast

Indonesia
 INDOPEX 1993 (6th Asian International Stamp Exhibition), Surabaya, 29 May-4 June 1993.
 JAKARTA 1995 (8th Asian International Stamp Exhibition), Jakarta, 19–25 August 1995.
 JAKARTA 2008 (22nd Asian International Stamp Exhibition), Jakarta, 23–28 October 2008.
 INDONESIA 2012 (World Stamp Championship and Exhibition), Jakarta Convention Center, 18–24 June 2012 (FIP)
 BANDUNG 2017 World Stamp Exhibition (35th Asian International Stamp Exhibition), Bandung, 3–7 August 2017 (FIP).
 INDONESIA 2022 World Stamp Exhibition, Jakarta, 4–9 August 2022 (FIP)

Malaysia
 KUALA LUMPUR 1992 (5th Asian International Stamp Exhibition), Kuala Lumpur, 1–7 September 1992
 MALAYSIA 2014 World Youth Exhibition (29th Asian International Stamp Exhibition), Kuala Lumpur, 1–6 December 2014 (FIP)
 MALAYSIA 2020, Kuala Lumpur, Nov/December 2020 (FIP) The exhibition will not happen, as Jakarta City is the venue for the exhibition.

Philippines
 PHICIPEX 1954 Philippine Centenary International Philatelic exhibition, Manila, 25 April-9 May 1954

Singapore
 PHILEX 1987 (3rd Asian International Stamp Exhibition), Singapore, 21–23 December 1987
 SINGPEX 1994 (7th Asian International Stamp Exhibition), Singapore, 31 August-2 September 1994
 Singapore 1995 World Stamp Exhibition, Singapore, 1–10 September 1995
 SINGPEX 1998 (12th Asian International Stamp Exhibition), Singapore, 23–26 July 1998
 Singapore World Stamp Championship 2004, Singapore, 28 August-1 September 2004 (FIP)
 Singapore 2015 World Stamp Exhibition, Singapore, 14–19 August 2015 (FIP)
 SINGPEX 2019 (36th Asian International Stamp Exhibition), Singapore, 31 July-4 August 2019

Thailand
 Bangkok International Stamp Exhibition 1983, Bangkok, 4–13 August 1983
 THAIPEX 1989 (4th Asian International Stamp Exhibition), Bangkok, 4–8 August 1989.
 Bangkok world philatelic exhibition 1993, Bangkok, 1–10 October 1993 (FIP)
 BANGKOK 2000 (13th Asian International Stamp Exhibition), Bangkok, 25 March-3 April 2000 (FIP)
 Bangkok 2003 International Stamp Exhibition, Bangkok, 4–13 October 2003 (FIP)
 BANGKOK 2007 (20th Asian International Stamp Exhibition), Bangkok, 3–12 August 2007.
 Bangkok 2010 (25th Asian International Stamp Exhibition), Bangkok, 4–12 August 2010.
 Thailand 2013 World Stamp Exhibition, Bangkok, 2–8 August 2013 (FIP)
 BANGKOK 2016 (32nd Asian International Stamp Exhibition), Bangkok, 10–15 August 2016.
 Thailand 2018 World Stamp Exhibition, Bangkok, 28 November–3 December 2018 (FIP)

Oceania

Australia
 International philatelic exhibition, Melbourne, 29 October-1 November 1928
 5th Australasian Philatelic Exhibition, Sydney, March 1932
 MIPEX '63 International Philatelic Exhibition, Melbourne, 7–12 October 1963
 SYDPEX '80 World Philatelic Exhibition, Sydney,
 AUSIPEX '84 World Philatelic Exhibition, Melbourne, 21–30 September 1984 (FIP)
 STAMPEX 1986 (2nd Asian International Stamp Exhibition), Adelaide, South Australia, 4–10 August 1986.
 SYDPEX 88 : Bicentennial national stamp exhibition, R.A.S. Showground 30 July to 7 August
 Australia 99: the Melbourne World Stamp Expo, Melbourne, 19–24 March 1999 (FIP)
 Pacific Explorer 2005 International Stamp Exhibition, Sydney, 21–24 April 2005 (FIP)
 AUSTRALIA 2013 World Stamp Exhibition, Melbourne, 10–15 May 2013 (FIP)
 National Exhibition 10–12 October 2014, Drill Hall, Torrens Parade Grounds, Adelaide
 Melbourne 2017 (34th Asian International Stamp Exhibition), Melbourne, 30 March-2 April 2017 (FIP)

New Zealand
 Canterbury Centennial International Philatelic Exhibition, Canterbury, 18–25 November 1950
 New Zealand International Stamp Exhibition, Auckland, 16–22 July 1955
 PANPEX '77 International Stamp Exhibition, Christchurch, 5–12 March 1977
 Zeapex '80 International Stamp Exhibition, Auckland, 23–31 August 1980
 NZ National Philatelic Literature Exhibition (held every two years since 1989)   
 New Zealand 1990 World Stamp Exhibition, Auckland, 24 August-2 September 1990 (FIP)
 Auckland 2018 – Remembrance International Stamp Exhibition, Auckland, 8–13 November 2018
 NZ 2020 FIAP 37th Asian International Stamp Exhibition, Auckland, 19–22 March 2020
Cancelled due to outbreak of COVID-19

Papua New Guinea
 PANGEX 1967 Philatelic Exhibition, Port Moresby, 1–3 September 1967

Europe

West

Austria
 Wiener Philatelistenclub Postwertzeichenausstellung, Vienna, 13–20 November 1881
 Internationalen Postwertzeichen-Ausstellung, Wien, 20 April-4 May 1890
 Internationalen Postwertzeichen-Ausstellung, Wien, 7–17 September 1911
 Internationalen Postwertzeichen-Ausstellung, Wien, 1–9 September 1923
 WIPA 1933 Internationale Postwertzeichen-Ausstellung = International philatelic exhibition, Wien, 24 June-9 July 1933
 Wipa 1965 Wiener Internationale Postwertzeichenausstellung, Wien-Hofburg, 4–13 June 1965
 IFA WIEN 1968 Internationale Flugpost-Ausstellung, Wien, 30 May-4 June 1968
 Wien '75 Internationale Briefmarkenausstellung, Wien, 27 November-7 December 1975
 Wipa 1981 Wiener Internationale Postwertzeichenausstellung, Vienna, 22–31 May 1981 (FIP)
 WIPA 2000 - Wiener Internationale Postwertzeichen-Ausstellung, Vienna, 30 May-4 June 2000 (FIP)
 WIPA08 Briefmarken-Weltausstellung, Wien, 18–21 September 2008 (FIP)

Belgium
 Exposition Internationale de Timbres-Poste, Anvers, 1887
 Exposition Internationale de Timbres Poste, Bruxelles 1924
 Exposition Universelle de Timbres-Poste, Anvers, 9–15 August 1930
 SITEB Philatelic Exhibition, Brussels, May 1935
 BEPITEC Exposition Philatelique International du Centenaire, Brussels, 1–10 July 1949 
 Expo '58, Brussels Universal & International Exposition 
 Belgica 72 Exposition Philatélique Internationale = Internationale Filatelistische Tentoonstelling, Brussels, 24 June-9 July 1972 (FIP)
 THEMABELGA '75 Wereldtentoonstelling Van Thematische Filatelie, Brussels, 13–21 October 1975 (FIP)
 Belgica 82 Exposition Philatélique Internationale = Internationale Filatelistische Tentoonstelling, Brussels, 11–19 December 1982 (FIP)
 Belgica 2001 International Stamp Exhibition, Brussels, 9–15 June 2001 (FIP)
 Belgica '06 International Stamp Exhibition, Brussels, 16–20 November 2006 (FIP)
 Antverpia 2010, Antwerp, 9–12 April 2010

France
 L'Exposition Internationale de Timbres-Poste au Champ-de-Mars, Paris, 15–24 September 1892
 Exposition Philatelique Internationale, Paris, 28 August-9 September 1900
 Exposition Philatelique Internationale, Paris, 21–30 June 1913
 Exposition Philatelique internationale Paris, 2–12 May 1925
 Exposition Philatelique internationale, Strasbourg, 4–12 June 1927
 Exposition Philatelique internationale, Le Havre, 18–26 May 1929
 Exposition Internationale de Poste Aerienne (EIPA), Paris, 6 November-24 December 1930
 Pexip: Exposition philatélique internationale, Paris, 18–27 June 1937
 Citex-Paris 1949 Exposition du centenaire du timbre poste français, Paris, 1–12 June 1949
 Philatec '64 Exposition Philatelique internationale, Paris, 5–21 June 1964
 ARPHILA '75 Exposition Philatelique internationale, Paris, 6–16 June 1975 (FIP)
 Philexfrance '82, Paris, 11–21 June 1982 (FIP)
 Philexfrance '89 exposition mondiale de philatélie, Paris, 7–17 July 1989 (FIP)
 Philexfrance '99 exposition philatélique mondiale, Paris, 2–11 July 1999 (FIP)
 Salon du timbre et de l'écrit (Paris, one-shot in 1994, every two years since 2004 up to 2014)

Germany
 Internationale Postwertzeichen-Ausstellung, Munich, 29 September-9 October 1889
 Die Internationale Ausstellung von Postwertzeichen, Magdeburg, 4–11 May 1890
 Internationale Postwertzeichen-Ausstellung, Mülhausen i. Eis, 12–16 April 1903
 Internationale Postwertzeichen-Ausstellung, Berlin, 25 August-4 September 1904
 Internationale Postwertzeichen-Ausstellung, Kassel, 9–23 August 1914
 IPOSTA 1930 Internationale Postwertzeichen-Ausstellung = International Philatelic Exhibition, Berlin, 12–21 September 1930

 Mophila Internationale Ausstellung Moderner Philatelie, Hamburg, 22–30 August 1931
 Ostropa 1935 Internationale Osteuropäische Postwertzeichen-Ausstellung, Königsberg, 23 June-3 July 1935
 Interposta 1959 Internationale Postwertzeichen-Ausstellung, Hamburg, 22–31 May 1959 
 Internationale Briefmarkenschau der Messestädte, Leipzig, 1 August-18 September 1960
 LUPOSTA 1962 Internationale Luftpost Ausstellung, Berlin, 12–16 September 1962
 IBRA München '73 Internationale Briefmarken Ausstellung, Munich, 11–20 May 1973 (FIP)
 IKUBA '74 Internationale Briefmarken Ausstellung, Kulmbach, 2–11 August 1974
 SOZ-PHILEX 77 Internationale Briefmarken-Ausstellung, East Berlin, 19–28 August 1977
 ESSEN '80 Internationale Briefmarken Ausstellung, Essen, 15–19 November 1980
 LUPOSTA 1983 Internationale Briefmarken Ausstellung, Cologne, 1983
 SOZPHILEX Postgeschichte '85 Briefmarken-Ausstellung, East Berlin, 4–13 October 1985
 LILIENTHAL 91 Internationale Briefmarken Ausstellung, Dresden, 16–25 August 1991 (FIP)
 IBRA 99 Internationale Briefmarken Ausstellung, Nuremberg (FIP)
 IBRA 2009, Essen.
 IBRA 2023, Essen, 25–28 May 2023 (FIP)

Luxembourg
 Exposition internationale des timbres-poste, Luxembourg, 4–8 September 1927
 Centilux 1952 Exposition internationale du centenaire des timbres-poste luxembourgeois, Luxembourg, 24 May-4 June 1952
 Melusina 1963 Exposition internationale de timbres-poste, Luxembourg, 13–21 April 1963
 JUVENTUS '69 International Youth Stamp Exhibition, Luxembourg, 3–8 April 1969 (FIP)
 JUVALEX '78 International Youth Stamp Exhibition, Luxembourg, 6–10 April 1978 (FIP)
 JUVALEX '98 International Youth Stamp Exhibition, Luxembourg, 18–21 June 1998 (FIP)

Monaco
 Exposition Philatelique Internationale, Monte Carlo, 18–26 February 1928
 Reinatex 1952 Exposition philatélique internationale, Monte Carlo, 6 April-4 May 1952
 Exposition Philatelique: 100 Years of Monaco's Stamps, Monte Carlo, 5–8 December 1985
 Exposition Philatélique Internationale, Monte Carlo, 13–17 November 1987
 Monaco'97, 1997
 MonacoPhil 1999
 MonacoPhil 2000
 MonacoPhil 2002
 MonacoPhil 2004
 MonacoPhil 2006
 MonacoPhil 2011
 Exposition Philatélique Internationale, Monte Carlo, 4–6 December 2009
 Monacophil 2013, Monte Carlo, 5–7 December 2013
 Monacophil 2015, Monaco, 2–5 December 2015

Netherlands
 Internationale Postzegeltentoonstelling, 's-Gravenhage, 17–22 July 1896
 Internationale Postzegeltentoonstelling, 's-Gravenhage, 10–19 August 1901
 Internationale Postzegeltentoonstelling, Amsterdam, 3–10 June 1909
 Internationale Postzegeltentoonstelling, 's-Gravenhage, 6–17 September 1924
 ITEP '52 Internationale Tentoonstelling Eeuwfeest Postzegel, Utrecht, 28 June-6 July 1952
 Amphilex '67 internationale filatelistische tentoonstelling, Amsterdam, 11–21 May 1967
 Amphilex '77 Internationale postzegeltentoonstelling, Amsterdam, 26 May-5 June 1977 (FIP)
 Filacento Internationale postzegeltentoonstelling ter gelegenheid van 100 jaar georganiseerde filatelie in Nederland, Den Haag, 6–9 September 1984
 Filacept '88 Holland Europa Internationale Postzegeltentoonstelling, [Den Haag]. 18–23 October 1988
 FEPAPOST 94 internationale postzegeltentoonstelling, Den Haag, 17–23 October 1994
 Amphilex 2002, Amsterdam, 30 August-3 September 2002

Switzerland
 Exposition Internationale de Timbres-Poste, Geneva, 8–23 August 1896
 Internationale Postwertzeichen-Ausstellung, Berne, 3–12 September 1910
 Exposition Internationale de Timbres-Poste, Geneva, 3–12 September 1922
 Imaba 1948 Internationale Briefmarken-Ausstellung = Exposition philatélique internationale = Esposizione filatelica internazionale = International philatelic exhibition, Basle, 21–29 August 1948
 INTERNABA 1974 Internationale Briefmarkenausstellung = Exposition philatélique internationale, Basle, 7–16 June 1974 (FIP)
 LURABA '81 International Stamp Exhibition, Lucerne, 17–24 March 1981 (FIP)
 TEMBAL '83 International Thematic Stamp Exhibition, Basle, 21–29 March 1983 (FIP)
 Ticino '2003 esposizione internazionale di filatelia, Locarno, 18–22 June 2003
 HELVETIA 2022 World Stamp Exhibition, Lugano, 18–22 May 2022 (FIP)

East

Bulgaria
 Sofia 1969 World Philatelic Exhibition, Sofia, 31 May-8 June 1969
 PHILASERDIKA '79 World Philatelic Exhibition, Sofia, 18–27 May 1979 (FIP)
 Bulgaria '89 World Philatelic Exhibition, Sofia, 22–31 May 1989 (FIP)
 Bulgaria '99 World Philatelic Exhibition, Sofia, 5–10 October 1999
 European Philatelic Exhibition, Sofia, 27–31 May 2009
 BULGARIA 2020, Plovdiv, 
30 September-2020 - 4 October(FIP). Cancelled due to outbreak of COVID-19.

Czech Republic
 BRNO 1923 Mezinarodni vystavy postovnich znamek, Brno, 5–15 August 1923
 Praga 1938 International Philatelic Exhibition, Prague, 26 June-4 July 1938
 Praga 1955 Mezinarodni vystava postovnich znamek, Prague, 10–25 September 1955
  Světová výstava poštovních známek, Prague, 18 August-2 September 1962
 Praga 1968 World Stamp Exhibition, Prague, 22 June-7 July 1968
 Praga 1978 World Stamp Exhibition, Prague, 8–17 September 1978 (FIP)
 Světová výstava poštovních známek Praga 1988, Prague, 26 August-4 September 1988 (FIP)
 Praga 1998 mezinárodní výstava poštovních známek, Prague, 7–10 September 1998
 BRNO 2005 European Stamp Exhibition, Brno, 10–15 May 2005
 Praga 2008 International Stamp Exhibition, Prague, 12–14 September 2008 (FIP)
 Praga 2018 World Stamp Exhibition, Prague, 15–18 August 2018 (FIP)
 Liberec 2022 European Stamp Exhibition and Polar Salon, Liberec, 13–16 October 2022 (FIP)

Hungary
 Budapest 1961 International Stamp Exhibition, Budapest, 23 September-3 October 1961
 Budapest '71 International Stamp Exhibition, Budapest, 4–12 September 1971
 EUROFILEX'85, Budapest, 14–31 October 1985
 EUROFILEX'92, Budapest, 12–16 September 1992
 Hunphilex 2000, Budapest, 18–21 August 2000
 Hunfila 2002 International Stamp Exhibition, Budapest, 3–6 October 2002
 Hunfila 2007 International Stamp Exhibition, Budapest, 27–30 September 2007
 Hunphilex 2022, Budapest, 31 Mar–3 April 2022

Poland
 BALPEX, Gdansk, 1959
 POLSKA '60 Międzynarodowa Wystawa Filatelistyczna, Warsaw, 27 September-9 October 1960
 POLSKA 73 Światowa Wystawa Filatelistyczna = World Postage Stamp Exhibition, Poznan, 19 September-2 October 1973 (FIP)
 POLSKA '93 World Philatelic Exhibition, Poznan, 7–16 May 1993 (FIP)
 Świętochłowice 2000 International Philatelic Exhibition, Świętochłowice, 12–18 October 2000
 POLKOWICE 2011 European Youth Stamp Exhibition, Polkowice, 1–7 October 2011 (FEPA)

Romania
 BALKANPHILA’91, Bacau, 20–24 September 1991
 World Philatelic Exhibition, Bucharest, 20–27 June 2008 (FIP)

Russia
 "Большой Урал - 82" - Stamp Exhibition in Chelyabinsk, Ural region of the USSR, in 1982 in honor of 60 anniversary of the USSR creation.
 Moskva '97 Vsemirnai︠a︡ filatelistskai︠a︡ vystavka = World Philatelic Exhibition, Moscow, 17–26 October 1997 (FIP)
 St Petersburg 2007 International Stamp Exhibition, St. Petersburg, 19–25 June 2007 (FIP)

Slovakia
 Medzinárodná Výstava Poštových Známok Slovensko 2002, Bratislava, 4–10 July 2002

North

Denmark
 Hafnia '76 International Stamp Exhibition, Copenhagen, 20–29 August 1976 (FIP)
 Hafnia '87 World Philatelic Exhibition, Copenhagen, 16–25 October 1987 (FIP)
 Hafnia '94 World Philatelic Exhibition, Copenhagen, 27–30 January 1994 (FIP)
 Hafnia '01 World Philatelic Exhibition, Copenhagen, 16–21 October 2001 (FIP)
 Nordia 2017, Vejle, 27–29 October 2017

Finland
 Finlandia 56, Helsinki-Helsingfors, 7–15 July 1956
 Finlandia 88 filatelian maailmannäyttely = filatelisk världsutställning = world philatelic exhibition, Helsinki, 1–12 June 1988 (FIP)
 Finlandia '95 World Stamp Exhibition, Helsinki, 10–15 May 1995 (FIP)
 Finlandia 2017 European Stamp Exhibition, Tampere 24–28 May 2017 (FIP)

Ireland
STAMPA (annual national stamp exhibition since 1972)

Norway
 Internasjonal Frimerkeutsilling, Oslo, 4–12 June 1955
 Nidaro '78 Nordic Fairmark Exhibition Trordheim Norway, 19–24 September 1978
 NORWEX '80 International Stamp Exhibition, Oslo, 13–22 June 1980 (FIP)
 NORWEX 97 spesialisert filatelistisk verdensutstilling for posthistorie og luftpost = specialized world philatelic exhibition for postal history and aerophilately, Oslo, 16–21 April 1997 (FIP)

Sweden
 IBERO-AMER Frimarksexpo, Stockholm, 12 October 1949
 Stockholmia '55 Filatelistiska Världsutställningen, Stockholm, 1–10 July 1955
 Stockholmia '74 Internationell Frimärksutställning, Stockholm, 21–29 September 1974 (FIP)
 Stockholmia '86 Internationell Frimärksutställning, Stockholm, 29 August-7 September 1986 (FIP)
 Stockholmia 2019 Internationell Frimärksutställning, Stockholm, 29 May-2 June 2019

United Kingdom
London Philatelic Exhibition 1890
London Philatelic Exhibition 1897
 International Philatelic Exhibition, City Art Gallery, Manchester, 29 June-5 July 1899
 International Philatelic Exhibition, Caxton Hall, Westminster, 23 May-1 June 1906
 Jubilee International Stamp Exhibition, Royal Horticultural Hall, London, 14–19 October 1912
 London International Stamp Exhibition, Royal Horticultural Hall, London, 14–26 May 1923
 APEX International Air Post Exhibition
Stamp Centenary Exhibition 1940
London International Stamp Exhibition 1950
London International Stamp Exhibition 1960
 Royal Philatelic Society London's Centenary Exhibition, Seymour Hall, London, 11–20 April 1969
Philympia 1970
 APEX 73 International Airmail Exhibition
London 1980 International Stamp Exhibition (FIP)
Stamp World London 1990 (FIP)
 EURAPEX''93 Aerophilatelic exhibition, London, 2–7 March 1993.
The Stamp Show 2000 (FIP)
London 2010 International Stamp Exhibition (FIP)
London 2015 Europhilex
London 2022 International Stamp Exhibition (FIP)
Stampex, London

South

Italy
 Exposition Philatelique Internationale, Milan, 1894
 Exposition Philatelique Internationale, Turin, 1898
 Exposition Philatelique Internationale, Milan, 16–23 September 1906
 International philatelic exhibition, Torino, 14–23 October 1911
 Sicilia '59 esposizione filatelica internazionale, Palermo, 16–26 October 1959
 Italia '66 esposizione filatelica internazionale con sezione numismatica, Udine, 26–31 July 1966
 ITALIA '76 Esposizione mondiale di filatelia = World Stamp Exhibition, Milan, 14–24 October 1976 (FIP)
 Italia '85 esposizione mondiale di filatelia, Rome, 25 October-3 November 1985 (FIP)
 Genova '92 esposizione mondiale di filatelia tematica, Genova, 18–27 September 1992 (FIP)
 Italia '98 Esposizione mondiale di filatelia, Milan, 23 October-1 November 1998 (FIP)
 ITALIA 2009 International Philately Festival, Rome, 21–25 October 2009

Malta
Maltex (annually 2000-)
Gozo Philatelic Society Exhibition (annually 1999-)
Wirja Filatelika ta' Malta (annually 1970–1999)
Żejtun Philatelic Exhibition (annually every September 2003-) by the Żejtun Philatelic Group

Portugal
 PORTUGAL 1953 da Exposicao Filatelica International, Lisbon, 3–11 August 1953
 PORTUGAL '77 World Thematic Exhibition, Oporto, 19–28 November 1977 (FIP)
 PORTUGAL 1998, Lisbon, 4–13 September 1998 (FIP)
 PORTUGAL 2010 World Stamp Exhibition, Lisbon, 1–10 October 2010 (FIP)

San Marino
 San Marino 77: centenario del francobollo della Repubblica di San Marino, San Marino, 28 August-4 September 1977

Slovenia
 Filatelistična razstava z mednarodno udeležbo = Philatelic Exhibition with International Participation, Ljubljana, 15–19 September 1999
 Maribofila 2012 International Philatelic Exhibition, Maribor, 24–27 May 2012

Spain
 1950 Exposicion Conmemorativa Del Sello Español ECSE, Madrid, 12–22 October 1950 (FIP)
 Exposicion Y Congreso Internacional De Barcelona CIF-60, Barcelona, 26 March-6 April 1960 (FIP)
 España '75: Exposición Mundial de Filatelia, Madrid, 4–13 April 1975 (FIP)
 Espamer '80 Exposición Filatélica de América y Europa, Madrid, 3–12 October 1980
 España '84: Exposición Mundial de Filatelia, Madrid, 27 April-6 May 1984 (FIP)
 Espamer '87 Exposición Filatélica de América y Europa, La Coruña, 2–12 October 1987
 GRANADA '92 Exposición Mundial de Filatelia = World Stamp Exhibition, Granada, 24 April-3 May 1992 (FIP)
 ESPAMER '96 Exposición Mundial de Filatelia Aviación y Espacio, Seville, 4–12 May 1996 (FIP)
 LORCA '98 Exposicion Mundial De Literatura Y Filatelia Moderna, Granada, 3–7 June 1998 (FIP)
 España 2000 Exposición Mundial de Filatelia, Madrid, 6–14 October 2000 (FIP)
 España 2004 Exposición Mundial de Filatelia, Valencia, 22–30 May 2004 (FIP)
 España 2006 Exposición Mundial de Filatelia, Malaga, 7–13 October 2006 (FIP)

North America

Canada
 CAPEX '51 Canadian International Philatelic Exhibition, Toronto, 21–29 September 1951
 SARPHEX International VI 1959, Sarina, Ontario, May 15-17, 1959
 CAPEX '78 Canadian International Philatelic Exhibition, Toronto, 9–18 June 1978 (FIP)
 CAPEX '87 Canadian world philatelic exhibition, Toronto, 13–21 June 1987 (FIP)
 PHIL-EX CANADA. Royal York Hotel, Toronto, January 12-14, 1990
 CAPEX '96 world philatelic exhibition = exposition philatélique mondiale, Toronto, 8–16 June 1996 (FIP)
 Royal*2011*Royale, RPSC Annual Convention, Dorval, Quebec
 VANPEX, annual regional philatelic exhibition sponsored by the British Columbia Philatelic Society
CAPEX '22 International Philatelic Exhibition, Toronto, 9–12 June 2022

Mexico
 EFIMEX International Philatelic Exhibition, Mexico City, 1–9 November 1968

St Pierre et Miquelon
 SPM EXPO 2014, St Pierre et Miquelon, 24–28 September 2014
 SPM EXPO 2017, St Pierre et Miquelon, 1–4 June 2017

United States

International 
International Philatelic Exhibition (Engineering Societies' Building, New York, 27 October – 1 November 1913)
International Philatelic Exhibition (Grand Central Palace, New York, 16–23 October 1926)
TIPEX (Third International Philatelic Exhibition, New York, 9–17 May 1936)
CIPEX (Centenary International Philatelic Exhibition, Grand Central Palace, New York City, 17–23 May 1947)
FIPEX (Fifth International Philatelic Exhibition, New York Coliseum, New York City, 28 April – 6 May 1956)
SIPEX (Sixth International Philatelic Exhibition, Washington, D.C., 21–30 May 1966)
INTERPHIL Seventh International Philatelic Exhibition, Philadelphia, 29 May-6 June 1976 (FIP)
AMERIPEX, Rosemont, IL, 1986 (FIP)
 OLYMPHILEX, Atlanta, GA, 19 July-3 August 1996
 PACIFIC '97, San Francisco, CA (FIP)
 WASHINGTON 2006, Washington, D.C., 27 May-3 June 2006 (FIP)
World Stamp Show-NY 2016 (FIP)
 World Stamp Show Boston 2026, Boston, 23–30 May 2026

APS Sponsored National 
StampShow - American Philatelic Society summer show
AmeriStamp Expo - American Philatelic Society winter show

APS World Series  
Americover - various locations - sponsored by the American First Day Cover Society
ARIPEX - multiple locations in Arizona
BALPEX -  Baltimore, Maryland
CHICAGOPEX - Chicago, Illinois
COLOPEX - Columbus, Ohio
Filatelic Fiesta - San Jose, California
FLOREX – Orlando, Florida
Garfield-Perry March Party - Cleveland, Ohio
INDYPEX - Indianapolis, Indiana
MILCOPEX - Milwaukee, Wisconsin
Minnesota Stamp Expo - Minneapolis, Minnesota
NAPEX – Washington, D.C.
National Topical Stamp Show - various locations - sponsored by the American Topical Association
NOJEX – northern New Jersey
OKPEX - Oklahoma City, Oklahoma
Omaha Stamp Show - Omaha, Nebraska
Philatelic Show - Boston, Massachusetts
PIPEX -  multiple locations in Oregon
Plymouth Show Detroit, Michigan
Rocky Mountain Stamp Show - Denver, Colorado (formerly ROMPEX)
ROPEX -  Rochester, New York
St. Louis Stamp Expo - St. Louis, Missouri
Sarasota National Stamp Exhibition - Sarasota, Florida
SEAPEX - Seattle, Washington
Southeastern Stamp Expo -  Atlanta, Georgia
TEXPEX - Dallas, Texas
WESTPEX -  San Francisco, California

Source - American Philatelic Society

Local 
BOPEX - Bowie, Maryland (Bowie Philatelic Exhibition)
CHARPEX - Charlotte, North Carolina (Charlotte Philatelic Society)
COMPEX - Chicago, Illinois
FALLSPEX - (Cuyahoga Falls Stamp Club)
HUNTSPEX - Huntsville, Alabama (Huntsville Philatelic Club)
MEMPHEX - Memphis, Tennessee (Memphis Stamp Collectors Society)

Defunct or on Hiatus 

SEPAD (Southeast Pennsylvania and Delaware)
VAPEX (Virginia)

Puerto Rico 
 ESPAMER '82 International Philatelic Exhibition, San Juan, 12–17 October 1982

South America

Argentina
 EFIMAYO 1960 Exposición filatélica interamericana, Buenos Aires, 12–24 October 1960
 Buenos Aires '80 International Stamp Exhibition, Buenos Aires, 24 October-2 November 1980 (FIP)
 Argentina '85 (IV Exposición Mundial de Temática) International Stamp Exhibition, Buenos Aires, 5–14 July 1985 (FIP)
 Expo Río Grande 2012 Exposición Internacional de Filatelia, Rio Grande, Tierra del Fuego, 27 November-1 December 2012
 Córdoba 2013 Exposición Internacional de Filatelia, Córdoba, 23–27 April 2013
 Exposición Filatélica Internacional Expo Córdoba 2016, Córdoba, 23–27 August 2016 (FIAF)
 Buenos Aires 2019 Exposición Internacional de Filatelia, Buenos Aires, 26–31 August 2019

Brazil
 Porto Alegre Fiera Filatelica Brazilia November 15–30, 1932
 Porto Alegre Fiera Filatelica Brazilia November 15, 1933
 Brasiliana '79 International Stamp Exhibition, Rio de Janeiro, 15–23 September 1979 (FIP)
 Brasiliana '83 International Stamp Exhibition, Rio de Janeiro, 29 July-7 August 1983 (FIP)
 Brasiliana '93 International Stamp Exhibition, Rio de Janeiro, 30 July-8 August 1993 (FIP)
 Brasiliana 2013 International Stamp Exhibition, Rio de Janeiro, 19–25 November 2013 (FIP)
 Brasilia 2017 Specialized World Stamp Exhibition, Brasilia, 24–29 October 2017 (FIP)

Chile
 EXFIL 2018 Exposicion Filatélica Continental, Santiago, 9–13 October 2018

Colombia
 EXFIME 2011 Exposicion Filatélica Interamericana, Medellin, 19–24 October 2011
 Exposicion Filatelica del Pacifico Sur, Bogotá, 4–7 September 2013

Costa Rica
 EXPOFILATELIA 2013, San José, 1–7 November 2013

Paraguay
 Bicentenario Paraguay 2011 Exposición Filatélica Continental, Asunción, 5–10 May 2011

Uruguay
 Uruguay '77 Exposicion Internacional de Filatelia, Montevideo, 29 July-7 August 1977
 URUGUAY 2011 Exposición Internacional Filatélica Temática, Montevideo, 26–30 September 2011

See also
 Philatelic exhibition

References

External links
FIAF (Federación InterAmericana de Filatelia) Eventos 2015-2019
Exhibitions under FIP Patronage
FIAP Calendar
The FIAP Grand Prix Winners 2016-2018
Historic FEPA Exhibitions
The International Exhibitor Newsletter
National Philatelic Society Philatelic Exhibitions Holdings

Philatelic events